Jamie Flitner (née Moore, born July 10, 1964) is an American politician and a Republican former member of the Wyoming House of Representatives representing District 26 from January 10, 2017 until January 10, 2023.

Elections

2016
When incumbent Republican Representative Elaine Harvey announced her retirement, Flitner declared her candidacy for the seat.  Flitner defeated Timothy Mills and Philip Abromats in the Republican primary with 70% of the vote. She defeated Democrat Jean Petty and Constitution Party nominee Joyce Collins in the general election with 66% of the vote.

References

External links
Official page at the Wyoming Legislature
Profile from Ballotpedia

Living people
Republican Party members of the Wyoming House of Representatives
People from Greybull, Wyoming
1964 births
People from Buffalo, Wyoming
21st-century American politicians
21st-century American women politicians
Women state legislators in Wyoming